The 1994–95 St. John's Red Storm men's basketball team represented St. John's University during the 1994–95 NCAA Division I men's basketball season. The team was coached by Brian Mahoney in his third year at the school. St. John's home games are played at Alumni Hall and Madison Square Garden and the team is a member of the Big East Conference.

Off season

Departures

Class of 1994 signees

Roster

Schedule and results

|-
!colspan=9 style="background:#FF0000; color:#FFFFFF;"| Regular season

|-
!colspan=9 style="background:#FF0000; color:#FFFFFF;"| Big East tournament

|-
!colspan=9 style="background:#FF0000; color:#FFFFFF;"| NIT

References

St. John's Red Storm men's basketball seasons
St. John's
St. John's
St John
St John